Elisabeth Röckel (15 March 1793 – 3 March 1883) was a German soprano opera singer and the wife of the composer Johann Nepomuk Hummel.

Life
Röckel was born in Neunburg vorm Wald, Bavaria, and baptised Maria Eva. She was a sister of the opera singer Joseph August Röckel (1783–1870) who played Florestan in the second version of Beethoven’s opera Fidelio, which premiered in the Theater an der Wien in 1806. In the same year she came to Vienna, too, where she lived in a flat in the theater, together with her brother. In a register of the residents of the theater she is named "Elis [!] Rökel". According to this register in another flat of the theater lived the famous singer Anna Milder-Hauptmann with her family, who played the title role of Fidelio. She became a close friend of Elisabeth. Many sources show that Elisabeth often met Beethoven who fell in love with the beautiful young girl and wanted to marry her.

However, in April 1810 Elisabeth Röckel got an engagement at the theater in Bamberg where she made her stage debut as Donna Anna in Mozart's Don Giovanni and became a friend of the writer E. T. A. Hoffmann.

The German musicologist Klaus Martin Kopitz has suggested that Beethoven wrote his famous Bagatelle No. 25 for piano, commonly known as  "Für Elise", in the days of Elisabeth Röckel's departure from Vienna. It had the inscription "" [For Elise on 27 April (1810) as memento by L. v. Bthvn]. Indeed, Anna Milder-Hauptmann named her "Elise" in a letter to her.

During the days before Beethoven's death, she and her husband Hummel visited Beethoven several times, and cut and saved a lock of his hair. This was later discovered in 1934 in Florence by Wilhelm Hummel, a descendant of Johann Nepomuk Hummel. The lock of hair is now in the Beethoven Center of the San Jose State University.

From 1819 until her death at age 89, Röckel lived in Weimar.

References
Notes

Sources

Further reading
 Klaus Martin Kopitz, Beethoven’s ‘Elise Elisabeth Röckel: a forgotten love story and a famous piano piece, in: The Musical Times, vol. 161, no. 1953 (Winter 2020), pp. 9–26 klaus-martin-kopitz.de (PDF)
 Mark Kroll: Johann Nepomuk Hummel: A Musician’s Life and World, Lanham, Maryland: Scarecrow Press 2007, 
 Michael Lorenz: "'Die enttarnte Elise'. Die kurze Karriere der Elisabeth Röckel als Beethovens 'Elise'", Bonner Beethoven-Studien vol. 9, Bonn: Beethoven-Haus, 2011, pp. 169–190 Abstract online
 Michael Lorenz: "Maria Eva Hummel. A Postscript", Vienna 2013
 Michael Lorenz: Brief an die Herausgeber der Zeitschrift Die Tonkunst. Wien 2016.

1883 deaths
1793 births
19th-century German women opera singers
German sopranos